Parepigynum is a genus of liana in the family Apocynaceae, first described as a genus in 1973. It contains only one known species, Parepigynum funingense, native to Guizhou and Yunnan Provinces in China.

The species is listed as endangered.

References

Apocyneae
Endemic flora of China
Monotypic Apocynaceae genera
Endangered flora of Asia
Taxonomy articles created by Polbot